The Extraordinary and Plenipotentiary Ambassador of Peru to the Kingdom of Morocco is the official representative of the Republic of Peru to the Kingdom of Morocco.

The ambassador in Rabat is accredited to neighbouring Mauritania and Senegal, and has also been accredited to Equatorial Guinea, Ivory Coast and Mali.

Both countries established relations in 1964, and have maintained them since. After the unavailability of a chargé d'affaires in Morocco, the embassy in Rabat was closed from 1973 to 1986. During this time, the ambassador in Madrid was accredited to the country, and Peru established diplomatic relations with the Sahrawi Arab Democratic Republic, which did not appear to disturb its relations with Morocco.

List of representatives

See also
List of ambassadors of Peru to Algeria
List of ambassadors of Peru to Egypt
List of ambassadors of Peru to Spain

References

Morocco
Peru